Maximilien Quenum-Possy-Berry, Légion d'honneur (born December 5, 1911 in Cotonou, Dahomey, now Benin; died October 21, 1988 in Paris) was a politician who served as a Senator of the Fourth Republic, representing Dahomey in the French Senate from 1955 to 1958. He was also a teacher of philosophy and a writer on ethnology.

Personal life 
He was married to Marie-Antoinette Aubert ( Montélimar ) and had five children with her.

Writings
His book Légendes africaines: Côte d'Ivoire, Soudan, Dahomey (1946) was a collection of historical legends he recalled being told in his childhood by the elders of his village. The book, aimed at children, won an award from the Académie française. Most of his other books were academic ethnological studies; of particular note is his Au Pays du Fons: Us et Coutumes de Dahomey (1938), which was also lauded by the Académie.

References

External links
 page on the French Senate website

Beninese politicians
20th-century Beninese politicians
French Senators of the Fourth Republic
1911 births
1988 deaths
People from Cotonou
Beninese non-fiction writers
20th-century Beninese writers
Senators of French West Africa
20th-century non-fiction writers